Self/less is a 2015 American science fiction action thriller film directed by Tarsem Singh, produced by Ram Bergman and James D. Stern and written by Alex and David Pastor. The film tells the story of a business tycoon and billionaire named Damian Hale, who is diagnosed with a terminal illness. However, he manages to save his life with the aid of Professor Albright, who transfers Hale's consciousness into a new, younger body. The film stars Ryan Reynolds, Natalie Martinez, Matthew Goode, Victor Garber, Derek Luke, and Ben Kingsley.  Many of the film's elements are similar to the 1966 film Seconds.

Self/less was originally set to release on February 27, 2015, but because of multiple setbacks, it was not released until July 10, 2015. It was produced by Endgame Entertainment and was financed by Filmnation Entertainment.  The film grossed $12 million in North America and a total of $30 million worldwide, against a $26 million production budget.

Plot
Billionaire New Yorker Damian Hale is diagnosed with terminal cancer. He finds a business card directing him to Professor Albright, who informs him about a medical procedure called "shedding", in which one's consciousness is transferred into a new body. Damian agrees to the procedure and follows Albright's instructions to stage his own public death. Albright then transfers him into a new, younger body, and prescribes medication to alleviate the vivid hallucinations which he claims are side effects of the procedure.

Damian starts a new life in New Orleans under the incognito name of Edward Kidner and is quickly befriended by his neighbor Anton. He later forgets to take his medicine and has hallucinations of a woman and child. Damian (as Edward) questions Albright, who dismisses it, but accidentally mentions details of the hallucinations that Damian had not disclosed.

Albright then arranges for Damian to take a vacation in Hawaii, but Damian, convinced the hallucinations are a real memory, identifies a landmark he saw in his vision and heads to a farmhouse outside of St. Louis. There, he finds the woman, Madeline, who reacts to him as her apparently deceased husband Mark. Damian plays along as Mark, though he is shocked to learn that Mark may have sold himself to Albright, in order to pay for their daughter Anna's life-saving treatment. Damian and Madeline are suddenly attacked by Albright's men, including Anton. Damian fatally wounds Anton and kills his accomplices, then flees with Madeline to collect Anna from school.

At a nearby motel, Damian then uses a laptop to research additional details regarding "shedding", and discovers that a man named Dr. Francis Jensen, now deceased, was the pioneer researcher in the field of transhumanism. In a video, Damian notices a tic Jensen shares with Albright, then sees Albright sitting next to Jensen, deducing that Jensen may have shed his consciousness into Albright's body.

Damian then finds Jensen's wife, Phyllis, in a nursing home, but she is living with Alzheimer's and remembers nothing. Damian lures Jensen (Albright) to the facility, where he reveals that the pills are meant to fully eliminate the original personalities of the bodies used in the shedding procedure, telling Damian that without the pills, Damian's consciousness will die, and Mark's will re-emerge.

Jensen later escapes when more killers arrive. Damian is almost overpowered, but Madeline wounds the attacker, who proves to be Anton in a new body. Anton reveals that he has shed multiple times. While Damian confiscates Anton's pills, Anton taunts Madeline to ask her "husband" why he cannot answer personal questions about their life.

Madeline then confronts "Mark" over his lack of knowledge of their personal details, causing Damian to reveal the entire story. He takes her and Anna to his old friend Martin O'Neill, and convinces Martin to arrange for Madeline and Anna to flee to the Caribbean. When he and Madeline discover Anna playing with Martin's previously deceased child Tony, Martin admits that he allowed Tony to also use shedding, and that Jensen's men are coming. Damian then reveals shedding's secret to Martin, who reacts in shock and disgust. Damian distracts Jensen's men while Martin flees with the others. Damian again fatally injures Anton, but the other thugs realize that Damian is alone and turn to recapture Madeline and Anna.

Damian then purposely stops taking his medicine to experience more of Mark's memories, which reveal that Jensen has a lab in an abandoned warehouse. Jensen captures him and starts to shed Anton into Mark's body. Damian, remembering that metal interferes with the process, hides a bullet casing in his mouth, causing the Shedding Machine to malfunction and destroy Anton's consciousness. Masquerading as Anton, Damian then rescues the others. Although Jensen tries to claim that Damian needs him to survive, Martin was able to reverse-engineer the pills and give Damian the formula, allowing Damian  to safely torch Jensen to death with a flamethrower. After killing Jensen, he has Martin complete Madeline and Anna's escape to the Caribbean.

Damian later visits his estranged daughter Claire but does not reveal his presence inside Mark, simply giving her a letter that reconciles Claire with her father. Damian then travels to the Caribbean and fully stops taking his medicine. The real Mark then slowly re-emerges, and finds a video message from Damian thanking him for the time that he gave to him. The story concludes with Mark finally reuniting with his family.

Cast
 Ryan Reynolds as Damian Hale/Mark Bitwell: Reynolds plays both Damian Hale (in Mark Bitwell's body) and Bitwell.
 Ben Kingsley as Damian Hale: A wealthy business man who has a terminal illness. 
 Natalie Martinez as Madeline Bitwell: Wife of Mark Bitwell.
 Matthew Goode as Dr. Francis Jensen/Albright: The creator of the "shedding" process.
 Derek Luke as Anton, Damian's new friend.
 Victor Garber as Martin O'Neill, Damian's close friend 
 Jaynee-Lynne Kinchen as Anna Bitwell, Mark's and Madeline's daughter 
 Melora Hardin as Judy O'Neill, Martin's wife 
 Michelle Dockery as Claire Hale, Damian's estranged daughter 
 Sam Page as Carl
 Brendan McCarthy as Anton 2
 Thomas Francis Murphy as Dr. Jensen
 Sandra Ellis Lafferty as Phyllis Jensen
 Emily Tremaine as Mallory
 Teri Wyble as Andrea
 Mariana Vicente as Leah
 Dylan Lowe as Tony O'Neill

Production

Endgame Entertainment and FilmDistrict financed the film, quickly putting it into development after the success of the two companies' science fiction movie Looper. FilmNation pre-sold the film at Cannes in 2013. It was the first film to completely sell out at the festival. The strong pre-sales limited the two financiers' exposure to the budget. FilmDistrict was set to distribute the film in the United States, but the company shut down and was absorbed into Universal's subsidiary Focus Features.
 
Principal photography began in October 2013 in New Orleans. Scenes were filmed at the Commander's Palace and the Howling Wolf. A sequence shortly after the film begins, depicting Hale in his elaborate Manhattan apartment, was shot in the three-story Trump Tower penthouse that served as Donald and Melania Trump's primary residence until 2017.

Antônio Pinto composed the film score. Dudu Aram was credited for additional music, as he had been on other scores by Pinto.

Release
The film was originally set for release on February 27, 2015. On July 2, 2014, the feature's opening was rescheduled to April 17, 2015. On November 8, 2014, the studio once again postponed the release, to July 10, 2015. The first trailer was released on March 4, 2015. 

On May 20, 2015, Focus Features relaunched its Gramercy Pictures label for action, horror and science fiction movies. Self/less was to be released under the label, but Gramercy branding was absent from the final release. The revival of the Gramercy label would turn out to be short-lived.

Reception

Box office
Self/less was released in North America, Sweden and Turkey on July 10, 2015. In North America, it opened in 2,353 theaters, earning $5.4 million in its opening weekend and ranking number eight at the domestic box office. In Turkey, the film opened in fifth place, making $135,191 from 208 screens, and stayed in the box office for six weeks, finishing with a total of $495,953. It opened in Italy on September 10, 2015, and finished in seventh place with a total of $353,291. Self/less would gross $12.3 million in North America and $18.2 million in other territories, for a total of $30.5 million against a production budget of $26.0 million.

Critical response
The site's consensus reads: "Self/less boasts a potential-packed premise, but does frustratingly little with it, settling for lackluster action at the expense of interesting ideas." On Metacritic, the film has a score of 34 out of 100, based on the reviews of 30 critics, indicating "generally unfavorable reviews". In CinemaScore polls, audiences gave Self/less an average grade of B+ on an A+ to F scale.

The IGN review by Josh Lasser awarded it a score of 5.0 out of 10, saying, "For someone with great visual command of the medium, Singh's latest is a disappointment."

See also
XChange

References

External links
 
 
 
 

2015 films
2015 action thriller films
2010s chase films
2010s mystery thriller films
2015 science fiction action films
American mystery thriller films
American science fiction action films
American action thriller films
American chase films
Films about brain transplants
Films about amnesia
Films about cancer
Films about computing
Films about consciousness transfer
Films about death
Films about old age
Films directed by Tarsem Singh
Films produced by Ram Bergman
Films set in Chicago
Films set in New Orleans
Films set in New York City
Films set in St. Louis
Films set in the future
Films shot in Florida
Films shot in New Orleans
Films shot in New York City
Focus Features films
Gramercy Pictures films
Films scored by Antônio Pinto
2010s English-language films
2010s American films